Nayudumangalam is a township in Tiruvannamalai Taluk of Tiruvanamalai district, Tamil Nadu India. It has a population of 8,400 and in the altitude of 134m.

The Tamil Nadu government announced that there will be one SIPCOT built at Naidumanglam.

Transport

Road
This town lies on national highway NH 234, which runs from Villupuram to Mangalore.

Rail

The nearest railway station Agaram Sibbandi is on the Vellore-Thiruvannamalai rail route, about 17 km from Thiruvannamalai. The station is operated by the Southern Railway. To the north, Vellore Cantonment Railway Station is the main station next to Polur. To the south, Thiruvannamalai railway Station is the nearest major station.

Cities and towns in Tiruvannamalai district